The 2005–06 Nemzeti Bajnokság II was Hungary's 55th season of the Nemzeti Bajnokság II, the second tier of the Hungarian football league system.

League table

Western group

Eastern group

Top scorer

West
21 goals: Gábor Földes (Felcsút)
20 goals: Attila Korsós (Gyirmót)
17 goals: Károly Kovacsics (Felcsút)

East
17 goals: Norbert Palászhy (Vác)
14 goals: Roland Lengyel (Nyíregyháza)
13 goals: Attila Hadár (Makó)

See also
 2005–06 Magyar Kupa
 2005–06 Nemzeti Bajnokság I
 2005–06 Nemzeti Bajnokság III

References

External links
  
  

Nemzeti Bajnokság II seasons
2005–06 in Hungarian football
Hun